Vail Mills is a hamlet in the Town of Mayfield in Fulton County, New York, United States. It is located in the southeastern part of the town on New York State Route 30 (NY 30).

References

Geography of Fulton County, New York
Hamlets in Fulton County, New York